Nobutada Hiromatsu (born 8 July 1942) is a Japanese equestrian. He competed in the individual dressage event at the 1984 Summer Olympics.

References

External links
 

1942 births
Living people
Japanese male equestrians
Japanese dressage riders
Olympic equestrians of Japan
Equestrians at the 1984 Summer Olympics
Place of birth missing (living people)